Suillellus atlanticus is a species of bolete fungus found in coastal sand dunes in Galicia. Originally described as a species of Boletus in 2013, it was transferred to Suillellus the following year.

References

External links

atlanticus
Fungi described in 2013
Fungi of Europe